Thomas Sparks (born 7 February 1986) is a Swedish-born English singer-songwriter from London.  He is known for his songs "She's Got Me Dancing" and "I'm a Rope". His self-titled album was released on 11 May 2009 in the United Kingdom. He co-wrote The Prodigy song "Wild West" featured on the bonus disc for Invaders Must Die. He also features on the Filthy Dukes album Nonsense in the Dark on the song "Messages".

A clip of "She's Got Me Dancing" was used by Apple in the iPod Touch "Next Level Fun" television commercial as well as being featured in the soundtrack for the video game by EA Sports, FIFA 10. The song was included in the Ubisoft's Just Dance 3 video game and was featured in the game's trailer during the 2011 Gamescom. It was also used in an advertisement for the Sony Eyepet. The song "I'm a Rope" featured in the soundtrack of Codemaster's racing game Colin McRae: DiRT 2.

Tommy Sparks has also gone on to form a new band called Health Club.

He currently plays synths and guitar in Kele Okereke's solo band 'Kele'

Discography

Studio albums

Singles

References

External links
 Tommy Sparks Article on The Guardian
 

1986 births
Living people
English dance musicians
English pop musicians
English male singer-songwriters
People from Kilburn, London
Island Records artists
Swedish dance musicians
Singers from Stockholm
Swedish pop musicians
Swedish singer-songwriters
Nu-disco musicians
21st-century English singers
21st-century Swedish singers
21st-century British male singers